This book also contains the short story "Requiem" by Heinlein. There are other uses of "requiem".

Requiem: New Collected Works by Robert A. Heinlein and Tributes to the Grand Master (1992, TOR Books) is a retrospective on Robert A. Heinlein (1907–1988), after his death, edited by Yoji Kondo.

Table of contents 

 Preface — Virginia Heinlein
 Editor's Foreword — Yoji Kondo

Part I — Works of Robert A. Heinlein

 "Requiem"
 "Tenderfoot in Space"
 "Destination Moon"
 "Shooting Destination Moon"
 "The Witch's Daughters"
 "The Bulletin Board"
 "Poor Daddy"
 Guest of Honor Speech at the  Third World Science Fiction Convention — Denver, 1941
 Guest of Honor Speech at the  XIXth World Science Fiction Convention — Seattle, 1961
 Guest of Honor Speech — Rio de Janeiro Movie Festival, 1969
 Guest of Honor Speech at the  XXXIVth World Science Fiction Convention — Kansas City, 1976

Part II — National Air and Space Museum Heinlein Retrospective — 6 October 1988

 NASA  Medal for Distinguished Public Service for Robert A. Heinlein
 Our Noble, Essential Decency, retitled This I Believe  — read by Virginia Heinlein
 Speeches by the Panelists:
 Tom Clancy
 L. Sprague de Camp
 Jerry Pournelle
 Charles Sheffield
 Jon McBride
 Speeches by the Special Guests:
 Catherine Cook de Camp
 Tetsu Yano

Part III — Tributes to Robert A. Heinlein
 Poul Anderson — RAH: A Memoir
 Jim Baen — Jim Baen's RAH Story
 Greg Bear — Remembering Robert Heinlein
 J. Hartley Bowen, Jr. — Recalling Robert Anson Heinlein
 Arthur C. Clarke — Robert Heinlein
 Gordon R. Dickson — Robert Heinlein
 Joe Haldeman — Robert A. Heinlein and Us
 Larry Niven — The Return of William Proxmire
 Spider Robinson — Rah Rah R.A.H.!
 Spider Robinson — Robert
 Robert Silverberg — Heinlein
 Harry Turtledove — Thank You
 Jack Williamson — Who Was Robert Heinlein?
 Yoji Kondo and Charles Sheffield — Farewell to the Master

External links
 
 

Requiem
Requiem
Robert A. Heinlein